The Moothan are  a community in Palakkad district of Kerala, India, who primarily engage in trade. They believe themselves to have migrated to Kerala from Tamil Nadu in the 16th or 17th century, and refer to themselves as Arya Vaishya. They use titles such as Guptan, Mannadiyar and Tharakan.

References

External links
www.moothan.com

Social groups of Kerala